The South Sudan Federal Democratic Party (SSFDP), is a South Sudanese militant group fighting against the government around Torit in Eastern Equatoria State. This rebel group is different from but related to the larger similarly named "Federal Democratic Party/South Sudan Armed Forces" led by Peter Gadet, Gabriel Chang and Gathoth Gatkuoth.

The SSFDP surfaced at the beginning of December 2015, when a group of defectors from the SPLA seized control of a rural police post in Idolu near Torit.  Soon thereafter they took the town of Longiro. A battle in Oguruny left that town badly damaged.

The SSFDP is led by Anthony Ongwaja, who claims to have defected from the SPLA with the rank of Major General with the aim of establishing federal democracy in South Sudan. Members are reportedly predominantly Lotuko people.

References

2015 establishments in South Sudan
Factions of the South Sudanese Civil War
Political parties established in 2015
Political parties in South Sudan
Rebel groups in South Sudan